The African spotted creeper (Salpornis salvadori) is a small passerine bird, which is a member of the subfamily Salpornithinae of the treecreeper family Certhiidae. It is found in sub-Saharan Africa in open deciduous forest and mango groves. It does not migrate other than local movements.

The African spotted creeper has strongly spotted and barred plumage, clearly different from the treecreepers of the subfamily Certhiinae.

The African spotted creeper has a thin pointed down-curved bill, which it uses to extricate insects from bark, but it lacks the stiff tail feathers which the true treecreepers use to support themselves on vertical trees.

Its nests and eggs are quite different from those of the Certhiinae.  The nest is a cup placed on a horizontal branch, usually in a crotch, and camouflaged with spiders' egg sacs, caterpillar frass, and lichen.  The clutch is usually of three eggs, which are blue or greenish, marked with grey, lavender, and brown.

This species and the Indian spotted creeper were formerly considered conspecific and called the spotted creeper. Four distinct populations or subspecies are recognized within the distribution of the African species. The nominate salvadori described by Bocage in 1878 is found in eastern Uganda, western Kenya, Tanzania, Malawi and Mozambique. Subspecies emini described by Hartlaub in 1884 is found northwards from west Africa including Guinea, Sierra Leone, Nigeria, to Cameroon and Chad in the east. Subspecies erlangeri described by Neumann in 1907 is restricted to the  Ethiopian highlands. Subspecies xylodromus described by Clancey in 1975 is found in the Zambezi Escarpment, Mashonaland Plateau and adjoining Mozambique.

In addition to the treecreeper family, there are two other small bird families with 'treecreeper' or 'creeper' in their name – the Australian treecreepers and the Philippine creepers.

References

External links
 Spotted creeper - Species text in The Atlas of Southern African Birds.
Spotted creeper at The Internet Bird Collection.
BirdLife Species Factsheet.

African spotted creeper
African spotted creeper
African spotted creeper
African spotted creeper